The San Carlos Municipality is one of the nine municipalities (municipios) that makes up the Venezuelan state of Cojedes and, according to the 2011 census by the National Institute of Statistics of Venezuela, the municipality has a population of 106,760. The city of San Carlos is the municipal seat of the San Carlos Municipality.

History
Father Capuchino Fray Pedro de Berja founded the city of San Carlos de Austria on April 27, 1678.

Demographics
The San Carlos Municipality, according to a 2007 population estimate by the National Institute of Statistics of Venezuela, has a population of 97,860 (up from 85,402 in 2000). This amounts to 32.6% of the state's population.

Government
The mayor of the San Carlos Municipality is José Jesús Betancourt Sanoja, re-elected on October 31, 2004, with 52% of the vote.  The municipality is divided into three parishes; “San Carlos de Austria, Juan Angel Bravo, and Manuel Manrique.

Sites of interest

Religious buildings
Catedral de San Carlos
Iglesia Santo Domingo
Iglesia San Juan

Squares and parks
Plaza Bolívar

References

External links
Information on the municipalities of Cojedes 
Flag & Coat of Arms of San Carlos

Municipalities of Cojedes (state)